Yadollah Eslami was the editor in chief of Iranian newspaper Fath. Fath was shut down in 2000 after it had published an interview with Hussein-Ali Montazeri, and in January 2001 Eslami was convicted of publishing lies and anti-state propaganda. Fath was considered as the replacement of Khordad.

References

Year of birth missing (living people)
Living people
Iranian journalists
Iranian editors
Iranian newspaper publishers (people)
People convicted of spreading propaganda against the system by the Islamic Republic of Iran